Hard 'n Phirm was a comedy/parody musical duo based in Los Angeles.  The members are Chris Hardwick and Mike Phirman.  They began performing at UCLA in 1994, but broke up in 1997, to reform 7 years later.  After the success of their song "Rodeohead" (a bluegrass-style medley of covers of Radiohead songs), they released their first and only album to date: Horses and Grasses. The album includes the song "Pi," which gained popularity from its music video, which was directed by Keith Schofield.

Television and Internet specials 
In 2008, the duo aired their own special for Comedy Central Presents, which included performances of "American Dinosaurs", "Anything", a reprise of "Pi", and included the unreleased song "Not Illegal" as well as their performance art piece "Def Poetry Spam". In 2007 they appeared on the comedy compilation Comedy Death-Ray.  In February 2008, the group won the Effinfunny.com Comedian of the Year Award.  Phirman also voiced the character Narrator's Brother in the WordGirl episode "Mecha-Mouse".

They have written a number of television and podcast theme songs, including the theme to Doug Benson's long-running podcast Doug Loves Movies as well as Benson's 2010 Comedy Central series The Benson Interruption.

Discography

Studio albums

Recent work 
The duo wrote and performed the songs for Rob Zombie's The Haunted World of El Superbeasto, which was released on September 22, 2009.

Phirman released his first solo album in July 2010, The Very Last Songs I Will Ever Record (Part 1), which is available as a download from his website. He also recorded an album called "Songs to Sing at Children" in 2018.

References

External links

 Official website

Hard 'n Phirm
American comedy musical groups
Musical groups established in 1994
Musical groups disestablished in 1997
Musical groups reestablished in 2004
Musical groups disestablished in 2009
Parody musicians
Comedians from California
American parodists